An adjective referring to magnanimity
 an epithet, used for various rulers
 Magnanimous Records, a United States record label

See also
 A magnanimous act, a 1782 prose work by Friedrich Schiller